The Spencer-Stirling biplane was a 1910s British pusher configuration biplane designed and built by Herbert Spencer. It was sometimes referred to as a Spencer-Farman in reference to the design similarity to Henry Farman's designs.

Mainly based at Brooklands Aerodrome it was also flown around the country by Spencer on demonstration and training flights.

On 29 August 1911 Spencer obtained his Aviator's Certificate at Brooklands flying the biplane he built.

Operational history
After initial straight hops, the Spencer-Stirling was successfully tested by Henri Pecquet in June 1911 shortly before the Gnome engine was fitted. After passing his aviators certificate, Spencer used the Spencer-Stirling for competition and demonstration flights until the aircraft crashed on 25 February 1912.

References

Further reading

Notes

1910s British experimental aircraft
Rotary-engined aircraft
Biplanes
Aircraft first flown in 1910
Single-engined pusher aircraft